Traders premiered on February 1, 1996. Five seasons of the series were broadcast on Global between 1996 and 2000.

Series overview

Episodes

Season 1 (1996)

Season 2 (1996–97)

Season 3 (1997–98)

Season 4 (1998–99)

Season 5 (1999–2000)

External links 
 
Traders